Prem Nagar railway station (Urdu and ) is located in Prem Nagar village, Kasur district of Punjab province of the Pakistan. The railway station also serves the Lahore Dry Port, located adjacent to the station.

See also
 List of railway stations in Pakistan
 Pakistan Railways

References

External links

Railway stations in Kasur District
Railway stations on Karachi–Peshawar Line (ML 1)